Saratok  is a town, and the capital of the Saratok District (1,586.9 square kilometres) in Betong Division, Sarawak, East Malaysia in the island of Borneo. The last recorded district population was 54,400 (year 2020 census). Iban forms the majority of the population (51%) with Malay (40%), Chinese (7%), Bidayuh and Melanau minorities.

A majority of the Iban people live in longhouses in rural areas, planting paddy, pepper and tapping rubber to earn a living. Some of the Ibans in Saratok either work on or own an palm oil plantations. Generally, the Malay community live near rivers, fishing and planting pineapples, cocoa and coconut. A majority of the shopkeepers in Saratok town are Chinese.

Events
A main annual event in Saratok is the Saratok Regatta or Pesta Air Sungai Krian, a boat-racing event. This event usually takes place during one weekend in July. Many stalls selling things ranging from food to souvenirs are set up in the car park between Saratok Wet Market and a nearby Buddhist temple to capitalise on the number of people who throng to this event every year.

Facilities
There are three secondary schools and three primary schools in Saratok town and a number of rural primary schools. Saratok also have a pre-university college (Kolej Tingkatan Enam).

There are also Saratok Community Hospital, Klinik Welcare, Klinik PMG, Keluarga Supermarket, Nam Leong Supermarket, Everwin Supermarket, Eco Shop Supermarket, and more other facilities within the town.

There are also four banks in Saratok town (Maybank, Agro Bank, CIMB Bank, & RHB Bank).

Transport

Local bus

Climate
Saratok has a tropical rainforest climate (Af) with heavy to very heavy rainfall year-round.

Notable people
Notable people from Saratok include:
 YBhg. Datuk Amar Dunstan Endawie Enchana, former Deputy Chief Minister
Abang Sallehuddin Abg Shokeran - DBP General Director 
YB Datuk Ali Biju, Deputy Minister Of Energy And Natural Resources

References

Saratok District
Towns in Sarawak